The following is a list of the FCC-licensed radio stations in the U.S. state of Rhode Island, which can be sorted by their call signs, frequencies, cities of license, licensees, and programming formats.

List of radio stations

Defunct
 WALE
 WFCI
 WJAR-FM
 WKFD
 WRJI

References

 
Rhode Island
Radio